JIC may refer to:

 IATA code for Jinchang Jinchuan Airport, China
 John Innes Centre, centre for research and training in plant science located in Norwich, England
 Joint Intelligence Center
 Joint Industrial Council, British labour-management group for an industrial sector
 Joint Information Center - see Incident Command System#Facilities
 Jordan Insurance Company, an insurance company in Jordan
 Jubail Industrial College, Saudi Arabia 
 Jubilee International Church, a Pentecostal church in London, UK
 Just in case (Manufacturing)
 "just in case" in internet slang (also "JiC")
 Juventud de Izquierda Comunista (Communist Left Youth), youth branch of the Organization of Communist Left in Spain
 Joint Intelligence Committee (United Kingdom), a Cabinet-level group which oversees British intelligence operations
 JIC fitting, Joint Industry Council standard for screw-together ends for machinery tubing